Vroil is a commune in the Marne department in north-eastern France.

Geography
The village lies above the right bank of the Chée, which flows southwestward through the south-eastern part of the commune.

See also
Communes of the Marne department

References

Communes of Marne (department)